is the 53rd single by Japanese idol girl group AKB48. It was released in Japan by King Records on September 19, 2018. The single would feature Jurina Matsui as the center performer, but due to health issues, she was absent from the music video and the first performances.

Background 
On June 16, 2018, the results of the 10th AKB48 Group general election, in which fans voted which members of AKB48 and its sister groups would participate in the AKB48 53rd single, was announced at the Nagoya Dome. Jurina Matsui of SKE48 placed first overall with 194,453 votes, making her the center performer for the single's titular main song. On the same day, it was announced that the single will be released on September 19 in five versions. On July 7, it was revealed that the title for the 53rd single would be "Sentimental Train".

Release 
Jurina Matsui went on hiatus due to poor health shortly after the election announcement, and she did not participate in early recordings and live performances of the single. In the music video, released on YouTube on August 22, her likeness was alternately replaced by a body double, a computer animated model, and hand-drawn illustrations. King Records announced that when Jurina returns from hiatus, the music video and single will be re-recorded with her participating.

Matsui returned from hiatus on September 6 and performed the song for the first time on Music Station the next day. The music video with Jurina is available for physical disc owners with a code allowing for users to view a re-recorded version of the music video and a new cover. On June 16, 2019, the complete version was released on YouTube.

Commercial performance 
"Sentimental Train" debuted atop the Oricon Singles Chart in its daily chart on September 18, 2018, maintaining the spot for the next four days. It fell to number 2 in its sixth day and to number 4 in its seventh day. On the day of release, Billboard Japan reported that the single sold 1,551,061 copies in its first day

The song debuted atop the Oricon Singles Chart for the week of October 1, 2018, with 1,448,900 physical copies sold. The song debuted at number 86 on Billboard Japan Hot 100. In its second week, the song rose to number 79 and topped the chart a week later.

"Sentimental Train" was the best-selling single of September 2018, with 1,457,758 physical copies sold.

The song was the 2nd best-selling single of 2018 on Oricon. The song placed at number 32 at Billboard Japan's Hot 100 Year End and placed at number 2 on the Top Singles Sales Year End chart.

Track listing

Charts

Weekly charts

Year-end charts

Certifications

Release history

References 

AKB48 songs
2018 singles
2018 songs
Oricon Weekly number-one singles
Billboard Japan Hot 100 number-one singles
Song articles with missing songwriters